Free Yourself is the debut studio album by American singer-songwriter Fantasia, which was released on November 23, 2004.  The album sold 240,000 units in its first week, reaching number eight on the Billboard 200 chart. The album is certified platinum in the United States and has been nominated for ten awards, including three Grammy Awards.

Background and development

After winning American Idol, Fantasia signed to J Records with 19 Entertainment and began work on her debut album. The album was released on November 23, 2004. Its first single, "Truth Is," was released in December 2004. On June 29, 2004, her debut single "I Believe" was released and included as the closing track on Free Yourself. The album was recorded in 2003 and 2004, while Fantasia was a contestant on American Idol. She worked with various producers, including Louis Biancaniello, Craig Brockman, Bryan-Michael Cox, Clive Davis, Jermaine Dupri, Missy Elliott, Sean Garrett, Jazze Pha, Darkchild, Harold Lilly, Ric Rude, Soulshock & Karlin, The Underdogs, Sam Watters and Nigel Wright.

Critical reception

Free Yourself received mixed reviews. It got three out of five stars by both AllMusic.com and Rolling Stone magazine. It also received 2.5/5 stars by Slant Magazine. Stephen Thomas Erlewine of AllMusic said: "Free Yourself is looser and hipper than any previous American Idol album. Gone is Matthew Wilder, who contributed to Kelly's debut; gone are Neil Sedaka and Aldo Nova, who featured heavily on Clay's album. In their place are Missy Elliott, Jermaine Dupri and Rodney Jerkins, hip-hop hitmakers who give a good indication that this album is striving to seem fresh and hip, something that no other American Idol album has even attempted. Of course, the show-biz trappings haven't been completely abandoned -- Fantasia's showstopping rendition of Gershwin's "Summertime" has been revived, and it's been given an overwrought treatment that's slicker and more mannered than either of her performances of it on the show. And that reveals Fantasia's biggest weakness, which is part of the inherent flaw of American Idol: it rewards contestants who put on a show of being a great singer instead of actually being a great singer."

Commercial performance

In its first week of release, Free Yourself sold over 240,000 copies. It has sold over one million copies in United States. It debuted at number eight on the Billboard 200 album chart in US. It was certified Platinum by Recording Industry Association of America (RIAA). Free Yourself also peaked at number two on the US Billboard Top R&B/Hip-Hop Albums chart.

"Truth Is" and "Free Yourself" were number one singles on the Hot Adult R&B Airplay Songs chart and top three hits on the Hot R&B/Hip-Hop Songs chart. The latter peaked at number forty-one on the US Billboard Hot 100. "Baby Mama" peaked on number sixty on the Billboard Hot 100 and number sixteen on the Hot R&B/Hip-Hop Songs chart. "Truth Is" was the most successful single from Free Yourself, also peaking at number twenty-one on the Billboard Hot 100. Two more singles were released from the album: "It's All Good" and "Ain't Gon' Beg You".

Singles

The album had a series of hit singles with "Truth Is", "Baby Mama" and "Free Yourself". "Truth Is" achieved a record stay at number on the Adult R&B Airplay chart for a female artist at fourteen weeks. "It's All Good" was a club hit reaching the top ten, and "Ain't Gonna Beg You" received radio airplay.
"Truth Is" was released as the lead single on December 7, 2004. It peaked at number twenty-one on Billboard Hot 100, number two on Hot R&B/Hip-Hop Songs and number one on Adult R&B Airplay. It was the most successful single from the album.
"It's All Good" was released as the second single on April 12, 2005 on iTunes Store and Amazon.com in an EP format (Dance Vault Mixes EP). It was a top ten club hit.
"Baby Mama" was released on May 9, 2005 as the third single. It peaked at number sixty on Billboard Hot 100 and number sixteen on Hot R&B/Hip-Hop Songs chart.
"Free Yourself", the title track, was released on June 1, 2005 as the fourth single, peaking at number forty-one on Billboard Hot 100, number three on Top R&B/Hip-Hop Songs and number one on Adult R&B Airplay.
"Ain't Gon' Beg You" was released on August 8, 2005 as the fifth and final single, receiving radio airplay.

Track listing

Notes
 signifies co-producer
 signifies additional producer
Sample credits
"Truth Is" contains a sample from "The Highways of My Life", performed by The Isley Brothers.
"Selfish (I Want You to Myself)" contains a sample from "Dil Aaj Shair Hai", performed by Kishore Kumar.
"Baby Mama" contains a sample from "There Will Never Be Any Peace (Until God Is Seated at the Conference Table)", performed by The Chi-Lites.

Personnel

Kamel Abdo - engineer, mixing
Gerald Albright - saxophone
Maxi Anderson - choir, chorus
Carlos Bedoya - engineer, mixing, programming
Charile Bereal - drum programming
Louis Biancaniello - arranger, keyboards, mixing, producer, programming
Leslie Brathwaite - mixing
Craig Brockman - keyboards, producer
Chris Brown - assistant
Eric Butler - choir, chorus
Debra Byrd - choir, chorus
David Campbell - string arrangements, string conductor
Darius Campo - violin
Vadim Chislov - assistant
Steve Churchyard - audio engineer, engineer
Nicholas Cooper - choir, chorus
Larry Corbett - cello
Bryan-Michael Cox - producer
Eric Dawkins - main personnel, backing vocals
Joel Derouin - violin
Kevin Dorsey - choir, chorus
Laura Marie Duncan - stylist
Jermaine Dupri - producer
Missy Elliott - audio production, main personnel, producer, backing vocals
Fantasia Barrino - vocals
Angela Fisher - choir, chorus
Gloria Elias Foeillet - make-up
Matthew Funes - viola
Armen Garabedian - violin
Berj Garabedian - violin
Sean Garrett - engineer, producer, vocal producer
Jon Gass - mixing
Tamyra Gray - main personnel, backing vocals
Laurence Greenfield - violin
Julian Hallmark - violin
Dabling Harward - editing, engineer
David Heuer - assistant
Ross Hogarth - engineer
John Horesco IV - engineer
Bill Hughes - orchestra contractor
Jun Ishizeki - assistant engineer
Jazze Pha - main personnel, producer, rap

Rodney Jerkins - mixing, producer
Jeff Kanan - assistant
Karlin - arranger, instrumentation, producer
Mark Kiczula - assistant engineer
Darlene Koldenhoven - choir, chorus
Chris LeBeau - artwork
Natalie Leggett - violin
Mario de León - violin
Lil' Steve - main personnel, backing vocals
Allison Lilly - backing vocals
Harold Lilly - producer
Bill Malina - audio engineer, engineer
Manny Marroquin - mixing
Yolanda McCullough - digital editing, engineer
Byron Motley - choir, chorus
Neeko - hair stylist
Bobbi Page - choir, chorus
Alyssa Park - violin
Sara Parkins - violin
Michael Parnin - mixing
Bob Peterson - violin
Charles Pettaway - guitar, main personnel
Greg Phillinganes - piano
Ric Rude - producer
Tom Ranier - orchestration
Aaron Renner - assistant
Brian Scheuble - engineer
Robin Sellars - engineer
Gabe Sganga - assistant engineer
Deborah Sharpe-Taylor - choir, chorus
Dan Smith - cello
Isabel Snyder - photography
Nico Solis - engineer
Soulshock - arranger, instrumentation, producer
Soulshock & Karlin - audio production
Nisan Stewart - drums
Jazmine Sullivan - main personnel, backing vocals
Phil Tan - mixing
Tank - main personnel, various instruments
Melanie Taylor - choir, chorus
The Underdogs - audio production, instrumentation, main personnel, producer, various instruments
Sam Watters - arranger, producer, backing vocals
Tony Wilkins - choir, chorus
Yvonne Williams - choir, chorus
Evan Wilson - viola
John Wittenberg - violin
Terry Wood - choir, chorus
Nigel Wright - producer
Alexis Yraola - art direction, design

Charts

Weekly charts

Year-end charts

Certifications

Awards and nominations

References

2004 debut albums
Fantasia Barrino albums
J Records albums
Albums produced by Bryan-Michael Cox
Albums produced by Missy Elliott
Albums produced by the Underdogs (production team)
19 Recordings albums